Nijazi Azemi (16 June 1970 – 26 March 2001) was an Albanian soldier of the Kosovo Liberation Army (KLA) and later Liberation Army of Preševo, Medveđa and Bujanovac (UÇPMB), best known for his support in the Kosovo war. During the war, he had the nickname "Komandant Mjekrra" (Commander Beard in English). He was part of Brigade 115 "Karadaku", which was later renamed Brigade 115 "Njazi Azemi" following his death.

Early life 
Nijazi Azemi was born on June 16, 1970, in the village of Mogillë. His father, Ramush Azemi, was the grandson of Fazli Tërpeza, a rebel who died in 1945 in the Battle of Slakovc against Yugoslav forces. During his youth, Nijazi Azemi was a good student, but he did not continue his education due to the conditions at that time. Later he began to deal with special constructions with wood carving, quickly shaping the profession. He soon started making wood art in his free time. 

Azemi had taken part in various demonstrations organized by Albanians in western cities. On March 29, 1989, in another protest against the Serbian government in Kosovo, Azemi was injured after a clash with Serbian police. It took him ten days to recover from his injuries at a hospital in Pristina. He then continued to recover in various hospitals in Ljubljana. After going there with the help of the Migjeni association,  Nijazi Azemi began training with the KLA.

The Serbian police in Kosovo had investigated the danger that Azemi would pose to them. For this reason, during the '90s, he was searched and his house was raided many times, with motives of searching for weapons of various kinds. In 1996 alone, Nijazi's house was raided four times by Serbian police. These actions had often forced Nijazi to lead an illegal life. In order to avoid being arrested by the Serbian Police, he had gone beyond the borders of Kosovo and took refuge with his comrades in Debar, Macedonia and in other places of the Albania several times.

The Kosovo War 
Like other Albanian youth, in the early 1990s, Azemi became the object of persecution for the purpose of being recruited into the ranks of the Yugoslav Army. Calls for recruitment to the army had reached him many times. But he had been determined not to answer these calls. He had openly stated that he would never accept becoming a soldier of Communist Yugoslavia. 

The time to fight the Yugoslav Army for Azemi came with the formation of the KLA and the beginning of the Kosovo War. Azemi quickly rose up the ranks in the Army. In the summer of 1998, he himself became part of these insurgencies, as a member of the 134th Brigade "Bedri Shala", which operated in the Operational Zone of Dukagjini. Azemi took part in the Battle of Košare on the border between Yugoslavia and Albania. Azemi fought in the Dukagjini Operational Zone until his return to his native village and family, on June 28, 1999 when the war ended. He had returned there as an armed victor, ready to fight more to establish Greater Albania. This attitude of his seemed to have been noticed by the Kosovo Force (KFOR) troops, who, during their deployment in Kosovo, had turned their attention to him. But even this attention did not prevent him from joining the ranks of the UÇPMB.

The war in the Preševo Valley 
Following the end of the Kosovo War, Azemi later joined the UÇPMB. In the UÇPMB, Azemi also had a commanding position, of which he was known as Komandant Mjekrra. He was the commander of the 115th "Karadak" brigade of the UÇPMB, which after his death was renamed the "Nijazi Azemi" brigade. In the numerous UÇPMB battles, Azemi fought until the internationally mediated signing of the agreement between the warring parties to end the conflict. Despite the ceasefire, he had openly stated that he would not hand over his weapons and that it was not clear to him what his superiors had signed. "I did not seize the weapons to hand them over," Azemi stated.

Death 
On March 26, 2001, Azemi and other UÇPMB fighters were situated near the village of Caravajka in the municipality of Presevo. Serbian forces were also stationed in this village and in the afternoon of this date, a shootout erupted and Azemi  was hit by a sniper bullet. Although he was wearing a  bulletproof vest, he was hit in the left side of the chest. Despite first-aid intervention, Azemi died of from his wound.

On March 28, 2001, the body of Nijazi Azemi was exhibited in the Adem Jashari square in Vitina, in front of thousands. He was buried that day, in the Martyrs' Cemetery in Vitina. A square in the city of Vitina bears the name of Nijazi Azemi. His time has been reflected in many newspaper articles and in a documentary.

References

1970 births
2001 deaths
Albanian nationalists in Kosovo
Kosovo Albanians
Kosovo Liberation Army soldiers
People from Viti, Kosovo
Yugoslav people of Albanian descent
Military personnel killed in the Kosovo War